Hilde de Baerdemaeker (born 8 May 1978) is a Flemish actress. She is best known for her roles as Louise in Louislouise, and as Linda De Leenheer in De Zaak Alzheimer (in English: The Memory of a Killer or The Alzheimer Case), Team Spirit, and Halleluja. 
She reprised her role as Linda de Leenheer in Dossier K.

Filmography

 Alias 2002 - Eva
 Team Spirit II 2003 - Katia
 Fear Factor 2003 Herself
 De zaak Alzheimer 2005 - Linda de Leenheer
 Oekanda 2005 "Nicole"
 Focus 2005-2006 Presentation
 Webcameraden 2005-2006  Maxxime
 Witte Raven 2006 Herself
 Wittekerke 2007-2008 - Kathleen
 Halleluja 2008 - Amanda
 Louislouise 2008-2009 Louise De Roover
 Dossier K 2009 - Linda de Leenheer
 Coppers 2016 - Liese Meerhout
 Zone Stad - Gabrielle (one episode)
 Sketch up (Various Characters)
 Bouwmeester  presentatrice
 Wit Down Under  presentation
 Fight Girl

Theatre 
 Froe Froe (Orfee)
 Fun (regie M. De Wilde)
 Othello (regie A.Pringels)
 Don Quichot (regie H. De Weerdt)
 De tramlijn die Verlangen heet (regie P. Bangels)
 Bloedbruiloft (regie P. Bangels)
 RapBattle (regie T. Hermsen)
 Wieskiewijven (regie Jan Steen)
 Aiao (regie F. Van der Aa)
 Mirandolina (regie: K. Smets)
 De Celliste, K. Smets (regie: K.Smets)
 Het huis van Bernarda Alba, G. Lorca (regie: K.Smets)
 Koning Van Katoren;; (regie F. Taveirne)
 Ratten en Rakkers (regie F. Bakeland)
 All Aboard (regie D. Coussement)
 Hallo Mister Fiever (regie E. Goossens)
 Nimh (regie E. Goossens)
 De Wiz (regie J. Lammertijn)
 Naar (regie J. Lammertijn)
 Annie (regie F. Bakeland)
 Erik'' (regie K. De Schepper)

References

21st-century Flemish actresses
1978 births
Living people
Flemish film actresses
Flemish stage actresses